Badminton tournaments were held for the fifth time at the 8th Asian Games in 1978 from 9 December to 20 December in Bangkok, Thailand.

Medalists

Medal table

Participating nations

Semifinal results

Final results

References
Team results

External links
Badminton Asia

 
Badminton
Asian Games
Multi-sport events, Asian Games
Multi-sport events, Asian Games
1978